The 2005–06 season was the 106th season in Società Sportiva Lazio's history and their 18th consecutive season in the top-flight of Italian football. Lazio finished Serie A in 6th place, but were later placed in 16th, just above the relegation zone due to involvement in the 2006 Italian football scandal.

Squad

Goalkeepers
  Angelo Peruzzi
  Samir Handanovič
  Marco Ballotta
  Matteo Sereni

Defenders
  Guglielmo Stendardo
  Felice Piccolo
  Manuel Belleri
  Luciano Zauri
  Sebastiano Siviglia
  Matías Lequi
  Andrea Giallombardo
  Massimo Oddo
  Cribari
  Cristiano Gimelli

Midfielders
  Roberto Baronio
  Fabio Firmani
  Ousmane Dabo
  César
  Massimo Bonanni
  Stefano Mauri
  Fabio Liverani
  Gaby Mudingayi
  Miguel Mea Vitali
  Christian Keller
  Christian Manfredini
  Valon Behrami
  Guilherme Siqueira

Attackers
  Paolo Di Canio
  Roberto Muzzi
  Igli Tare
  Tommaso Rocchi
  Goran Pandev
  Simone Inzaghi

Serie A

League table

Matches

Topscorers
  Tommaso Rocchi 16
  Goran Pandev 12
  Massimo Oddo 6 (6)
  Paolo Di Canio 5

References

S.S. Lazio seasons
Lazio